Clubul Sportiv Municipal Câmpia Turzii was a Romanian professional football club from Câmpia Turzii, Cluj County, Romania, founded in 1921 and dissolved in 2021. Throughout the years, the club has had five other names, Metalul, Industria Sârmei, Energia, Mechel and Seso.

History
The club was founded in 1921 as Industria Sârmei and played in the district and regional championship. In 1936–37 season played in Divizia C finishing 5th out of 6 in the Series II of the North League and in 1937–38 season won the promotion to Divizia B.

With the name of Metalul, the team from Campia Turzii, played for two years in the Liga I, their best performance being 12th place in the 1952 season.

It was the fifth club representing Divizia B which reached the Romanian Cup final, which was lost with 0–2 against Progresul Oradea.

In the summer of 2008 it changed its traditional name of Industria Sârmei Câmpia Turzii to Mechel Câmpia Turzii.

But this change proved to be disastrous, because at the end of the 2008–09 season the club was relegated to Liga III. Soon after it changed its name to Seso Câmpia Turzii.

The following seasons it missed the promotion back to Liga II by a hair pin, finishing 2nd in 2010 and 2011. In 2012 it finished 6th, and in 2013 7th.

In the summer of 2013 the club was dissolved.

During the same summer, the club was refounded as Industria Sârmei 1921 Câmpia Turzii.

As a result of financial problems, the club entered in a deadlock again in the winter of 2017, collapsing in the summer of 2017; it was refounded again, this time as CSM Câmpia Turzii.

Chronology of names

Honours

Leagues
Liga I
Best finish: 12th 1952
Liga II
Winners (1): 1951
Runners-up (7): 1938–39, 1940–41, 1947–48, 1953, 1955, 1961–62, 1964–65
Liga III
Winners (4): 1937–38, 1971–72, 1977–78, 1981–82, 2000–01
Runners-up (7): 1972–73, 1989–90, 1995–96, 1996–97, 1997–98, 2009–10, 2010–11
Liga IV – Cluj County
Winners (2): 1992–93, 1994–95

Cups
Cupa României
Runners-up (1): 1956
Cupa României – Cluj County
Runners-up (1): 2018–19

References

External links
Official website

 
Association football clubs established in 1921
Association football clubs disestablished in 2021
Defunct football clubs in Romania
Sport in Cluj County
Football clubs in Cluj County
Liga I clubs
Liga II clubs
Liga III clubs
Liga IV clubs
1921 establishments in Romania
2021 disestablishments in Romania
Câmpia Turzii